Caofang may refer to:

 Caofang Station (草房), Beijing Subway, China
 Caofang Village (曹坊), Bailuquan Township, Shijiazhuang, Hebei Province, China
 Caofang Township (曹坊), Ninghua County, Sanming, Fujian Province, China

See also

 Cao Fang (disambiguation)